107 Mothers is a Russian-Language Slovak drama film directed by Péter Kerekes and released in 2021. Its world premiere took place on 1 September 2021 at the 78th Venice International Film Festival, where it was screened in Horizons competition program. It was selected as the Slovak entry for the Best International Feature Film at the 94th Academy Awards.

Plot
In a Ukrainian women's prison, mothers are permitted to serve their sentences with their children until their third birthday.

Cast
 Maryna Klimova		
 Iryna Kiryazeva
 Lyubov Vasylyna

See also
 List of submissions to the 94th Academy Awards for Best International Feature Film
 List of Slovak submissions for the Academy Award for Best International Feature Film

References

External links
 

2021 films
2021 drama films
2020s Russian-language films
Slovak drama films